Donaldson is a Scottish and Irish patronymic surname meaning "son of Donald". It is a simpler Anglicized variant for the name MacDonald. Notable people with the surname include:


A 
Alastair Donaldson (1955–2013), Scottish musician
Alex Donaldson (1890–1972), Scottish footballer
Alexander Donaldson (disambiguation), multiple people
Ally Donaldson (born 1943), Scottish footballer
Andrea Donaldson, Canadian theatre director
Andrew Brown Donaldson (1840–1919), English artist
Andrew Donaldson (footballer, born 1884) (fl. 1910s), Scottish footballer
Andy Donaldson (1925–1987), English footballer
Arthur Donaldson (1901–1993), Scottish politician and journalist
Arthur Donaldson (actor) (1869–1955), Swedish-American actor

B 
Ben Donaldson (rugby league), Australian rugby league player
Bob Donaldson (1868–1947), Scottish footballer
Blake F. Donaldson (1892–1966), American Physician
Bobby Donaldson (1922–1971), American drummer
Brittni Donaldson (born 1993), American basketball coach
Bruce Donaldson (born 1938), Australian politician

C 
Charles Edward McArthur Donaldson (1903–1964), Scottish politician
Chris Donaldson (born 1975), New Zealand sprinter
Clayton Donaldson (born 1984), English footballer
Clyde Donaldson (1894–1979), Australian rules footballer
Colby Donaldson (born 1974), American television actor

D 
Dave Donaldson (footballer born 1954), English footballer
Dave Donaldson (footballer born 1941), English footballer
David Donaldson (disambiguation), multiple people
Denis Donaldson (1950–2006), Northern Irish volunteer in the Provisional IRA and a member of Sinn Féin
Doug Donaldson (born 1957), Canadian politician

E 
Ed Donaldson (born 1959), American boxer
Edward Donaldson (1816–1889), American naval officer
Edward Mortlock Donaldson (1912–1992), British flying ace
Elena Donaldson-Akhmilovskaya (1957–2012), Russian chess player
Eric Donaldson (born 1947), Jamaican singer-songwriter

F 
Frances Donaldson (née Lonsdale, 1907–1994), British writer and biographer
Fred Donaldson (1937–2018), English footballer

G 
Gary Donaldson (born 1952), Canadian ice hockey player
Glenn Donaldson, American musician
Gordon Donaldson (1913–1993), Scottish historian
Gordon Donaldson (journalist) (1926–2001), Scottish-Canadian author and journalist
Gordon Graham Donaldson (died 1809), British Army officer
Graham Donaldson (1935–2001), Australian rules footballer
Grant Donaldson (born 1976), New Zealand cricketer

H 
Harvey J. Donaldson (1848–1912), American politician
Hay Frederick Donaldson (1856–1916), English engineer
Helen Donaldson (born 1968), Australian singer
Henry Herbert Donaldson (1857–1938), American neurobiologist

I 
Ian Donaldson, Scottish musician
Ian Donaldson (footballer), Scottish footballer
Ian Stuart Donaldson (1957–1993), British musician

J 
J. Lyter Donaldson (1891–1960), American politician
Jack Donaldson (disambiguation), multiple people 
Jakim Donaldson (born 1983), American basketball player in the Israeli National League
James Donaldson (disambiguation), multiple people
Jamie Donaldson (born 1975), Welsh golfer
Jared Donaldson (born 1996), American tennis player
Jeff Donaldson (disambiguation), multiple people
Jeffery Donaldson, Canadian poet and critic
Jeffrey Donaldson (born 1962), Northern Irish politician
Jesse M. Donaldson (1885–1970), American politician
Jimmy Donaldson (born 1998), American YouTuber known as MrBeast
Joan Donaldson (1946–2006), Canadian journalist
John Donaldson (disambiguation), multiple people
((John Donaldson)) British School Teacher
Johnny Donaldson, American guitarist
Joseph Donaldson (1891–1973), Canadian politician
Josh Donaldson (born 1985), American baseball player
Julia Donaldson (born 1948), English writer and playwright
Julie Donaldson (born 1978), American journalist and beauty queen

K 
Kim Donaldson (born 1952), Zimbabwean artist
Kristian Donaldson, American comic book artist

L 
Leanne Donaldson (Born 1968), Australian politician
Liam Donaldson (born 1949), British doctor 
Lily Donaldson (born 1987), British model
Lou Donaldson (born 1926), American saxophonist

M 
Margaret Donaldson (born 1926), British psychologist
Mark Donaldson (born 1979), Australian soldier
Mark Donaldson (rugby player) (born 1955), New Zealand rugby union player
Mary Donaldson, Baroness Donaldson of Lymington (1921–2003), British politician
Mary Elizabeth Donaldson (born 1972), Australian-born Crown Princess of Denmark
Michael Donaldson (disambiguation), multiple people

N 
Norma Donaldson (1928–1994), American actress and singer

O 
O'Neill Donaldson (born 1969), English footballer

P 
Pat Donaldson (born 1943), Scottish bass guitarist
Pete Donaldson (born 1981), radio and television presenter
Peter Donaldson (disambiguation), multiple people

R 
Ray Donaldson (born 1958), American football player
Robert Donaldson (disambiguation), multiple people
Roger Donaldson (born 1945), Australian-born New Zealand film producer, director and writer

S 
Sam Donaldson (born 1934), American reporter and news anchor
Scott Donaldson (born 1994), Scottish snooker player
Simon Donaldson (born 1957), English mathematician
St Clair Donaldson (1863–1935), British-born Australian archbishop
Stephen R. Donaldson (born 1947), American novelist
Stewart Donaldson (born 1961), British-American psychologist
Stuart Donaldson (1812–1867), British-born Australian politician
Sue Donaldson (born 1962), Canadian author, independent researcher and philosopher

T 
Ted Donaldson (1933–2023), American actor
Thomas Donaldson (disambiguation), multiple people
Timothy Donaldson (1934–2013), Bahamian politician, banker, economist, and diplomat
Trose Emmett Donaldson (1914–1942), American naval lieutenant

V 
Vance Young Donaldson (born 1791), Northern Irish soldier and penal administrator

W 
Walter Donaldson (1893–1947), American songwriter
Walter Donaldson (snooker player) (1907–1973), Scottish snooker player
William Donaldson (disambiguation), multiple people

See also
Rebecca Donaldson-Katsopolis, fictional character on the TV sitcom Full House
Donaldson Brown (1885–1965), financial executive and corporate director with DuPont and General Motors Corporation

Scottish surnames
English-language surnames
Patronymic surnames